Élida Stantic (born April 7, 1942), and more commonly known and credited as Lita Stantic, is an Argentine cinema producer, screenplay writer, and director.

Stantic is one of the most important producers working in the "New Argentine Cinema," responsible for the debut films of some of the most critically well regarded new Argentine filmmakers such as Lucrecia Martel, Pablo Trapero, and Israel Adrián Caetano.

Biography
She has been working in the Argentine cinema since she was hired as an assistant director for the film Diario de campamento (1965).

Stantic then began making short films in the mid 1960s, but then changed her focus to advertising.

She remained active in Argentine cinema via the "Cine Liberacion," an underground production and distribution collective that secretly showed films that would have otherwise been banned in Argentina by the military government.

During the politically tumultuous 1970s in Argentina, Stantic worked on over a dozen films including Alejandro Doria's La isla (1978), which was the first Argentine film to be a box-office hit during the dictatorship.

During the 1980s she established the production company GEA Cinematografica together with Maria Luisa Bemberg. Later she was the founder of Lita Stantic Productions.

When the "New Argentine Cinema" began in the late 1990s, she has produced films which have been critically widely acclaimed.  Films such as A Red Bear, La Ciénaga, Bolivia, The Holy Girl and others.

Producer filmography (partial)
 El Verano del potro (1991) a.k.a. Summer of the Colt
 Un Muro de Silencio (1993) a.k.a. A Wall of Silence
 Dársena sur (1998)
 Mundo Grúa (1999) a.k.a. Crane World
 Bolivia (2001)
 La Ciénaga (2001) a.k.a. The Swamp
 Un Oso Rojo (2002) a.k.a. A Red Bear
 Tan de repente (2002) a.k.a. Suddenly
 Hamaca paraguaya (2006) aka Paraguayan Hammock
 La Niña Santa (2004) a.k.a. The Holy Girl

Producer television (partial)
 Sol de otoño (1996) a.k.a. Autumn Sun
 Historias de vidas, Encarnación Ezcurra (1998)
 Historias de vidas, Silvina Ocampo (1998)

Awards
Wins
 Havana Film Festival: Special Mention; for Tan de repente, 2002 and Un Oso Rojo, 2002.
 Locarno International Film Festival: Silver Leopard; for Tan de repente, 2002.
 Prince Claus Award, 2003
Locarno International Film Festival: Raimondo Rezzonico Prize for the best independent producer, 2007

Footnotes

External links
 Lita Stantic Productions Official web site 
 

1942 births
Argentine film directors
Argentine film producers
Argentine screenwriters
Argentine people of Croatian descent
Living people
Place of birth missing (living people)
Argentine women film directors
Argentine women film producers